Women is the debut album by Calgary band Women, recorded by fellow Calgary-native Chad VanGaalen. It was released in 2008 on VanGaalen's Flemish Eye record label in Canada, and on Jagjaguwar in the US.
The song "Sag Harbor Bridge" is a direct reference to the suicide of the artist Ray Johnson, like "Locust Valley" and "Venice Lockjaw" on Women's second album of 2010, Public Strain.

Recording 

Women was recorded by Polaris Music Prize-nominated Chad VanGaalen, in "[VanGaalen's] basement, an outdoor culvert and a crawlspace." It was recorded using boom boxes and tape machines, contributing to its lo-fi sound.

Reception 

Women was released to favourable reviews, with Cokemachineglow naming it as "the best 'indie rock' record released [in 2008], hands down."

Track listing

References

External links 

2008 debut albums
Women (band) albums
Flemish Eye albums
Jagjaguwar albums